Marshmallow is a type of confectionery that is typically made from sugar, water and gelatin whipped to a solid-but-soft consistency. It is used as a filling in baking or normally  molded into shapes and coated with corn starch. The sugar confection is inspired by a historical medicinal confection made from Althaea officinalis, the marsh-mallow plant.

History 

The word "marshmallow" comes from the mallow plant species (Althaea officinalis), a herb native to parts of Europe, North Africa, and Asia which grows in marshes and other damp areas. The plant's stem and leaves are fleshy, and its white flower has five petals. Ancient Egyptians were said to be the first to make and use the root of the plant to soothe coughs and sore throats and to heal wounds. The first marshmallows were prepared by boiling pieces of root pulp with honey until thick. Once thickened, the mixture was strained, cooled, then used as intended.

Whether used for candy or medicine, the manufacture of marshmallows was limited to a small scale. In the early- to mid-1800s, the marshmallow had made its way to France, where confectioners augmented the plant's traditional medicinal value with indulgent ingredients utilized by the Egyptians. Owners of small candy stores would whip the sap from the mallow root into a fluffy candy mold. This candy, called Pâte de Guimauve, was a spongy-soft dessert made from whipping dried marshmallow roots with sugar, water, and egg whites. It was sold in bar form as a lozenge. Drying and preparation of the marshmallow took one to two days before the final product was produced. In the late 1800s, candy makers started looking for a new process and discovered the starch mogul system, in which trays of modified corn starch had a mold firmly pushed down in them to create cavities within the starch. The cavities were then filled with the whipped marshmallow sap mixture and allowed to cool or harden. At the same time, candy makers began to replace the mallow root with gelatin which created a stable form of marshmallow.

By the early 1900s, thanks to the starch mogul system, marshmallows were introduced to the United States and available for mass consumption. They were sold in tins as penny candy and were soon used in a variety of food recipes like banana fluff, lime mallow sponge, and tutti frutti. In 1956, Alex Doumak patented the extrusion process which involved running marshmallow ingredients through tubes. The tubes created a long rope of marshmallow mixture and were then set out to cool. The ingredients were then cut into equal pieces and packaged.

Modern marshmallow manufacturing is highly automated and has been since the early 1950s when the extrusion process was first developed. Numerous improvements and advancements allow for the production of thousands of pounds of marshmallow a day. Today, the marshmallow typically consists of four ingredients: sugar, water, air, and a whipping agent.

Ingredients 
Marshmallows consist of four ingredients: sugar, water, air, and a whipping agent/aerator (usually a protein). The type of sugar and whipping agent varies depending on desired characteristics.  Each ingredient plays a specific role in the final product.

The marshmallow is a foam, consisting of an aqueous continuous phase and a gaseous dispersed phase (in other words, a liquid with gas bubbles spread throughout). In addition to being a foam, this also makes marshmallows an "aerated" confection because it is made up of 50% air. The goal of an aerated confection like a marshmallow is to incorporate gas into a sugar mixture, and stabilize the aerated product before the gas can escape. When the gas is introduced into the system, tiny air bubbles are created. This is what contributes to the unique textural properties and mouth-feel of this product.

Protein 
In marshmallows, proteins are the main surface-active agents responsible for the formation, and stabilization of the dispersed air.  Due to their structure, surface-active molecules gather at the surface area of a portion of (water-based) liquid. A portion of each protein molecule is hydrophilic, with a polar charge, and another portion is hydrophobic and non-polar. The non-polar section has little or no affinity for water, and so this section orients as far away from the water as possible. However, the polar section is attracted to the water and has little or no affinity for the air. Therefore, the molecule orients with the polar section in the water, with the non-polar section in the air. Two primary proteins that are commonly used as aerators in marshmallows are albumen (egg whites) and gelatin.

Albumen (egg whites) 
Albumen is a mixture of proteins found in egg whites and is utilized for its capacity to create foams. In a commercialized setting, dried albumen is used as opposed to fresh egg whites. In addition to convenience, the advantages of using dried albumen are an increase in food safety and the reduction of water content in the marshmallow. Fresh egg whites carry a higher risk of Salmonella, and are approximately 90 percent water. This is undesirable for the shelf life and firmness of the product. For artisan-type marshmallows, prepared by a candy maker, fresh egg whites are usually used. Albumen is rarely used on its own when incorporated into modern marshmallows, and instead is used in conjunction with gelatin.

Gelatin 
Gelatin is the aerator most often used in the production of marshmallows. It is made up of collagen, a structural protein derived from animal skin, connective tissue, and bones. Not only can it stabilize foams, like albumen, but when combined with water it forms a thermally-reversible gel. This means that gelatin can melt, then reset due to its sensitivity to temperature. This is what contributes to the "melt-in-your-mouth" sensation when a marshmallow is consumed—it actually starts to melt when it touches the tongue.

During preparation, the temperature needs to be just above the melting point of the gelatin, so that as soon as it is formed it cools quickly, and the gelatin will set, retaining the desired shape. If the marshmallow rope mixture exiting the extruder during processing is too warm, the marshmallow starts to flow before the gelatin sets. Instead of a round marshmallow, it will take a more oval form. Excessive heat can also degrade, or break down, the gelatin itself. Therefore, when marshmallows are being produced at home or by artisan candy makers, the gelatin is added after the syrup has been heated and cooled down.

In commercial operations, the gelatin is simply cooked with the sugar syrup, rather than being added later after the syrup has cooled. In this case, kinetics play an important role, with both time and temperature factoring in. If the gelatin was added at the beginning of a batch that was then cooked to 112–116 °C in 20–30 minutes, a significant amount of gelatin would break down. The marshmallow would have reduced springiness from that loss of gelatin. But since the time the syrup spends at elevated temperature in modern cookers is so short, there is little to no degradation of the gelatin.

In terms of texture, and mouth-feel, gelatin makes marshmallows chewy by forming a tangled 3-D network of polymer chains.  Once gelatin is dissolved in warm water (dubbed the "blooming stage"), it forms a dispersion, which results in a cross-linking of its helix-shaped chains.  The linkages in the gelatin protein network trap air in the marshmallow mixture and immobilize the water molecules in the network. The result is the well-known spongy structure of marshmallows. This is why the omission of gelatin from a marshmallow recipe will result in marshmallow creme, since there is no gelatin network to trap the water and air bubbles.

Sugars 
A traditional marshmallow might contain about 60% corn syrup, 30% sugar, and 1–2% gelatin. A combination of different sugars is used to control the solubility of the solution. The corn syrup/sugar ratio will influence the texture by slowing crystallization of the sucrose. The smooth texture of marshmallows relies on disordered, or amorphous, sugar molecules. In contrast, increasing the sugar ratio to about 60–65% will produce a grainy marshmallow. Temperature also plays an important role in producing smooth marshmallows by reducing the time window for ordered crystals to form. To ensure the sugars are disordered, the sugar syrup solution is heated to a high temperature and then cooled rapidly.

Sugarcane and sugar beet 
Sugarcane and sugar beet are the two primary sources of sugar, consisting of sucrose molecules. Sucrose is a disaccharide that consists of one glucose and fructose molecule. This sugar provides sweetness and bulk to the marshmallow, while simultaneously setting the foam to a firm consistency as it cools. Sucrose, and sugars in general, impair the ability of a foam to form, but improve foam stability. Therefore, sucrose is used in conjunction with a protein like gelatin. The protein can adsorb, unfold, and form a stable network, while the sugar can increase the viscosity. Liquid drainage of the continuous phase must be minimized as well. Thick liquids drain more slowly than thin ones, and so increasing the viscosity of the continuous phase will reduce drainage. A high viscosity is essential if a stable foam is to be produced. Therefore, sucrose is a main component of marshmallow. But sucrose is seldom used on its own, because of its tendency to crystallize.

Corn syrup 
Corn syrup, derived from maize, contains glucose, maltose, and other oligosaccharides. Corn syrup can be obtained from the partial hydrolysis of cornstarch. Corn syrup is important in the production of marshmallow because it prevents the crystallization of other sugars (like sucrose). It may also contribute body, reduce sweetness, and alter flavor release, depending on the Dextrose Equivalent (DE) of the glucose syrup used.

The DE is the measure of the amount of reducing sugars present in a sugar product in relation to glucose. Lower-DE glucose syrups will provide a chewier texture, while higher-DE syrups will make the product more tender. In addition, depending on the type of DE used, can alter the sweetness, hygroscopicity, and browning of the marshmallow. Corn syrup is flavorless and cheap to produce which is why candy companies love using this product.

Invert sugar 
Invert sugar is produced when sucrose breaks down due to the addition of water, also known as hydrolysis. This molecule exhibits all the characteristics of honey except the flavor because it is the primary sugar found in honey. This means that invert sugar has the ability to prevent crystallization, and produce a tender marshmallow. It is also an effective humectant, which allows it to trap water, and prevent the marshmallow from drying out. For some candies, this is not a good trait to have, but for marshmallows, it is an advantage since it has a high moisture content.

Fruit syrups 
While not widely used for traditional or commercial recipes, fruit syrups have been proposed as an alternative sugar for marshmallows.

Additional ingredients

Flavors 
Unless a variation of the standard marshmallow is being made, vanilla is always used as the flavoring. The vanilla can either be added in extract form, or by infusing the vanilla beans in the sugar syrup during cooking. This is the best technique to get an even distribution of flavor throughout the marshmallow.

Acids 
Acids, such as cream of tartar or lemon juice, may also be used to increase foam stability. Addition of acid decreases the pH. This reduces the charge on the protein molecules, and brings them closer to their isoelectric point. This results in a stronger, more stable inter-facial film. When added to egg whites, acid prevents excessive aggregation at the interface. However, acid delays foam formation. It may therefore be added toward the end of the whipping process after a stable foam has been created.

Manufacturing process

Commercial process 
In commercial marshmallow manufacture, the entire process is streamlined and fully automated.

Gelatin is cooked with sugar and syrup. After the gelatin-containing syrup is cooked, it is allowed to cool slightly before air is incorporated. Whipping is generally accomplished in a rotor-stator type device. Compressed air is injected into the warm syrup, held at a temperature just above the melting point of gelatin. In a marshmallow aerator, pins on a rotating cylinder (rotor) intermesh with stationary pins on the wall (stator) provide the shear forces necessary to break the large injected air bubbles into numerous tiny bubbles that provide the smooth, fine-grained texture of the marshmallow. A continuous stream of light, fluffy marshmallow exits the aerator en route to the forming step.

The marshmallow confection is typically formed in one of three ways. First, it can be extruded in the desired shape and cut into pieces, as done for Jet-Puffed marshmallows. Second, it can be deposited onto a belt, as done for Peeps. Third, it can be deposited into a starch-based mold in a mogul to make various shapes.

Home making process 
The home process for making marshmallow differs from commercial processes. In a separate step, gelatin is hydrated with enough warm water to make a thick solution. The marshmallow is then scooped out of the bowl, slabbed on a table, and cut into pieces.

Roasted marshmallows and s'mores 
A popular camping or backyard tradition in the United Kingdom, North America,  New Zealand and Australia is the roasting or toasting of marshmallows over a campfire or other open flame. A marshmallow is placed on the end of a stick or skewer and held carefully over the fire.  This creates a caramelized outer skin with a liquid, molten layer underneath. Major flavor compounds and color polymers associated with sugar browning are created during the caramelization process.

S'mores are a traditional campfire treat in the United States, made by placing a toasted marshmallow on a slab of chocolate, which is placed between two graham crackers. These can then be squeezed together, causing the chocolate to begin melting.

Nutrition 
Marshmallows are defined in US law as a food of minimal nutritional value.

Dietary preferences 
The traditional marshmallow recipe uses powdered marshmallow root, but most commercially manufactured marshmallows instead use gelatin in their manufacture. Vegans and vegetarians avoid gelatin, but there are versions which use a substitute non-animal gelling agent such as agar. In addition, marshmallows are generally not considered to be kosher or halal unless either their gelatin is derived from kosher or halal animals or they are vegan.

Marshmallow creme and other less firm marshmallow products generally contain little or no gelatin, which mainly serves to allow the familiar marshmallow confection to retain its shape. They generally use egg whites instead. Non-gelatin, egg-containing versions of this product may be consumed by ovo vegetarians. Several brands of vegetarian and vegan marshmallows and marshmallow fluff exist.

See also 

 Chocolate-coated marshmallow treats
 Chubby Bunny, children's game involving marshmallows
 Divinity (confectionery)
 Flump (sweet)
 Marshmallow creme
 Peeps
 Stanford marshmallow experiment
 Stay Puft Marshmallow Man

References

External links 

 The Marshmallow Explained at HowStuffWorks.com

Candy
Sugar confectionery
 
Skewered foods
Articles containing video clips